Governor Moses may refer to:

Franklin J. Moses Jr. (1838–1906), 75th Governor of South Carolina
John Moses (American politician) (1885–1945), 22nd Governor of North Dakota